Mert Çelik (born 10 June 2000) is a professional footballer who plays as a defender for Neftçi Baku, on loan from Başakşehir. Born in Turkey, he represents Azerbaijan at youth level.

Club career
Çelik made his first debut for Başakşehir in the Turkish Cup match against Hatayspor on 24 January 2019. He is grandfather from Baku.

On 19 September 2020, Neftçi PFK announced the signing of Çelik on two-year long loan.

On 18 October 2020, he made his debut in the Azerbaijan Premier League for Neftçi Baku match against Sabah.

References

External links
 

2000 births
Living people
Footballers from Istanbul
Association football defenders
Azerbaijani footballers
Azerbaijan youth international footballers
Azerbaijan under-21 international footballers
Turkey youth international footballers
Azerbaijani people of Turkish descent
Azerbaijan Premier League players
İstanbul Başakşehir F.K. players
Neftçi PFK players